The Iowa Central Air Line Rail Road, also derisively known as the Calico Railroad, is a historic railroad that operated in Iowa.

The railroad operated from Lyons, Iowa to Council Bluffs, Iowa and was organized in 1853.

Iowa residents purchased stock and Iowa counties voted bonds to help build the road. Early in 1854 work on the track between Lyons and Iowa City was begun and progressed rapidly.

The funds, however, were inadequate and some were misappropriated. As a result, work was stopped in June and engineers, contractors and laborers, involving some 2,000 persons in all, were left without their pay and without work. The Iowa counties, however, were compelled to redeem their bonds.

The railroad company had a store at Lyons, and the goods (including a supply of calico) were distributed in partial payment to the workers; hence the nickname.

References
Dictionary of American History by James Truslow Adams, New York: Charles Scribner's Sons, 1940

Defunct Iowa railroads
Predecessors of the Chicago and North Western Transportation Company
Railway companies established in 1853
Railway companies disestablished in 1864
Clinton, Iowa
1853 establishments in Iowa
1864 disestablishments in Iowa